SESC may refer to:

 Serviço Social do Comércio, a Brazilian non-profit organization
 Securities and Exchange Surveillance Commission, a Japanese financial regulatory organization
 Southeast Education Service Center, a non-profit organization in Utah, U.S.
 SESC-Pompeia (São Paulo Metro), a future station of the São Paulo Metro, Brazil